Promina is a mountain in inland Dalmatia, Croatia. Its highest peak is Velika Promina at 1,148 m.a.s.l.

References

Mountains of Croatia
Dalmatia